The Clayton Compromise was a plan drawn up in 1848 by a bipartisan United States Senate committee headed by John M. Clayton for organizing the Oregon Territory and the Southwest. Clayton first attempted to form a special committee of eight members, equally divided by region and party, two northern and two Southern men from each of the two great parties, with Clayton of Delaware himself acting as chairman, to consider the questions relating to the extension of slavery. It recognized the validity of Oregon's existing antislavery laws, prohibited the territorial legislatures of New Mexico and California from acting on slavery, and provided for appeal of all slavery cases from the territorial courts to the Supreme Court of the United States. It passed the Senate July 27, 1848, but it was tabled in the United States House of Representatives by a coalition of Southern Whigs led by future Confederate Vice President Alexander H. Stephens. Stephens believed that the compromise would completely surrender Constitutional rights in the territories, as he was certain that the Supreme Court would rule against slavery in the territories.

A problem arose in the United States. The question of whether slavery should exist in the new territories became a problem for Congress. Congress wanted a compromise that could solve this problem. The Clayton Compromise was drafted in 1848 by John M. Clayton. John M. Clayton was a Whig from Delaware who was chairman of group of Whigs and Democrats. This bill excluded slavery from Oregon. It also prohibited the territorial legislatures of New Mexico and California from acting on slavery. However, the compromise provided for the appeal of all slavery cases from the territorial courts to the Supreme Court. It passed the Senate 27 July 1848, but was tabled in the House of Representatives. After twenty-one hours of debate, the Senate passed the bill. Though the compromise was popular throughout the South, Alexander Hamilton Stephens spiked the Clayton Compromise in the House. Stephens claimed that Congress could not prohibit slavery in any U.S. territory. Robert Toombs agreed with Stephens but accepted the compromise before it died.>

The Clayton Compromise validated the provisional laws of Oregon-which excluded slavery-so far as not incompatible with the constitution of the US or with the bill itself, subject to the action of its territorial legislature; but prohibited the territorial legislature of New Mexico and California from passing laws relative to slavery, and provided for appeals from the territorial courts to the Supreme Court of the United States that would finally decide the question as to the status of slavery in the territories.
Thomas Ewing stated that the compromise bill (would have forever ended the quarrel between the North and the South) was defeated by the treason of Alexander Hamilton Stephens and seven other calculating demagogues from six different Southern states, and representing the strong whig districts.

To put it simply, the compromise stated that the congress should organize territorial governments for the country acquired from Mexico, neither admitting nor excluding the introduction of slavery into any portion of it. It would leave slavery to spread itself all over again. Whether these laws did or did not abolish it, or if they did, whether they were still in force were questions under the Clayton Compromise left to the decision of the Supreme Court.

Background History 
In the 19th century, manifest destiny was a widely held belief in the United States that its settlers were destined to expand westward across North America.

Mexican–American War was fought between United States of America and United Mexican States from 1846 to 1848. In the Treaty of Guadalupe Hidalgo in 1848, Mexico ceded parts of the modern day Southwest United States to the U.S. Mexican cession led to debate over slavery. Wilmot Proviso in 1848 was a result of the Mexican–American War that banned slavery in Mexican Cession, which was another choice other than the Clayton Compromise.

After the settlement of the Oregon boundary dispute in 1846, U.S. gained territory south of the 49th parallel line. Acquisition of Oregon territory in 1848 led to debate over slavery as well. When established, the territory encompassed an area that included the current states of Oregon, Washington, and Idaho, as well as parts of Wyoming and Montana.

In the compromise 
Clayton compromise was a bill the committee reported on July 18, 1848. It created a territorial government for Oregon, which allowed the unofficial provisional government's antislavery ban to continue in effect until the new territorial legislature ruled for or against slavery. But the Compromise explicitly banned the territorial government for New Mexico and California from taking any action either establishing or prohibiting slavery. The decision was left to the federal judiciary (Supreme Court of the United States).

The Clayton Compromise passed the senate but failed in the House, which refused to recede from the Wilmot Proviso.

Mostly Southern Democrats and Whigs supported the compromise, Northers from both parties and whigs mainly opposed the compromise. Charles G. Atherton and Samuel S. Phelps were the only New England Democratic and Whig Senators, respectively, to vote in favor of the Clayton Compromise bill. If Georgia's Alexander H. Stephens and seven other southern whigs voted like other Southerners, the Clayton Compromise would have survived and passed.

1850 Compromise 
The 1848 Compromise eventually failed which led to the Compromise of 1850. Compromise of 1850 added California as a free state and allowed popular sovereignty in Mexican Cession. There was also a more strict fugitive slave laws and slave trade was abolished in Washington D.C.

Notes
7. The American nation, a history: from original sources by associated scholars - 1904

Oregon Territory
Slavery in the United States
History of United States expansionism